Liolaemus saxatilis is a species of lizard in the family Liolaemidae. It is native to Argentina.

References

saxatilis
Reptiles described in 1992
Reptiles of Argentina
Endemic fauna of Argentina
Taxa named by Luciano Javier Ávila
Taxa named by José Miguel Alfredo María Cei